Hammerfest Fotballklubb is a Norwegian football club from Hammerfest, founded on 18 December 1994 as a merger between HIF/Stein and Indrefjord IL.

The men's team currently plays in the Third Division (fourth tier of Norwegian football), having last played in the Second Division in 2007. Since its formation in 1994 its other seasons in the Second Division came in 1998, 1999, 2001, 2002, 2003 and 2006.  In 2018 the club merged with HIF-Stein to create a new team called HIF-Stein.

Recent history
{|class="wikitable"
|-bgcolor="#efefef"
! Season
!
! Pos.
! Pl.
! W
! D
! L
! GS
! GA
! P
!Cup
!Notes
|-
|2000
|D3
|align=right bgcolor=gold|1
|align=right|22||align=right|20||align=right|1||align=right|1
|align=right|139||align=right|21||align=right|61
|
|Promoted to 2. Division
|-
|2001
|D2
|align=right |11
|align=right|26||align=right|8||align=right|4||align=right|14
|align=right|44||align=right|58||align=right|28
|1st round
|
|-
|2002
|D2
|align=right |10
|align=right|26||align=right|7||align=right|9||align=right|10
|align=right|52||align=right|58||align=right|30
|2nd round
|
|-
|2003
|D2
|align=right bgcolor=red|12
|align=right|26||align=right|9||align=right|2||align=right|15
|align=right|43||align=right|75||align=right|29
|2nd round
|Relegated to 3. Division
|-
|2004
|D3
|align=right bgcolor=cc9966|3
|align=right|22||align=right|14||align=right|3||align=right|5
|align=right|74||align=right|34||align=right|45
|
|
|-
|2005
|D3
|align=right bgcolor=gold|1
|align=right|22||align=right|17||align=right|3||align=right|2
|align=right|76||align=right|19||align=right|54
|
|Promoted to 2. Division
|-
|2006
|D2
|align=right |11
|align=right|26||align=right|8||align=right|5||align=right|13
|align=right|35||align=right|50||align=right|29
|2nd round
|
|-
|2007
|D2
|align=right bgcolor=red|14
|align=right|26||align=right|7||align=right|1||align=right|18
|align=right|23||align=right|69||align=right|22
|1st round
|Relegated to 3. Division
|-
|2008
|D3
|align=right |4
|align=right|22||align=right|11||align=right|3||align=right|8
|align=right|71||align=right|38||align=right|36
|1st qualifying round 	
|
|-
|2009
|D3
|align=right bgcolor=silver|2
|align=right|20||align=right|12||align=right|4||align=right|4
|align=right|66||align=right|30||align=right|40
|1st qualifying round 	
|
|-
|2010
|D3
|align=right |4
|align=right|22||align=right|11||align=right|5||align=right|6
|align=right|61||align=right|38||align=right|38
|1st round 
|
|-
|2011 
|D3
|align=right |7
|align=right|22||align=right|9||align=right|3||align=right|10
|align=right|42||align=right|45||align=right|30
|1st round 
|
|-
|2012
|D3
|align=right |5
|align=right|22||align=right|12||align=right|1||align=right|9
|align=right|56||align=right|40||align=right|37
|1st qualifying round 
|
|-
|2013 
|D3
|align=right |5
|align=right|22||align=right|10||align=right|1||align=right|11
|align=right|58||align=right|54||align=right|31
|1st qualifying round 
|
|-
|2014 
|D3
|align=right |5
|align=right|22||align=right|11||align=right|3||align=right|8
|align=right|43||align=right|34||align=right|36
|1st qualifying round 
|
|-
|2015 
|D3
|align=right |9
|align=right|22||align=right|7||align=right|2||align=right|13
|align=right|31||align=right|54||align=right|23
|2nd qualifying round 
|
|-
|2016
|D3
|align=right bgcolor=red|11
|align=right|22||align=right|4||align=right|1||align=right|17
|align=right|26||align=right|62||align=right|13
|1st qualifying round 
||Relegated to 4. Division
|-
|2017 
|D4
|align=right |4
|align=right|22||align=right|11||align=right|3||align=right|8
|align=right|43||align=right|27||align=right|36
|2nd qualifying round 
|
|}

Janis Vaitkus before are play professional level in FK Ventspils (Latvia),FK Tauras (Lithuania), FC Nuorese (Italy).Janis Vaitkus is the only player from FK Hammerfest to play in the European Cup before.Janis Vaitkus still play in club.

References

External links
 Official site
 Supporter site (informative)
Club history

Hammerfest
Football clubs in Norway
Association football clubs established in 1994
Sport in Finnmark
1994 establishments in Norway